Ermengarde of Tours (died 20 Mar 851) was daughter of Hugh of Tours and Ava of Morvois.

In October 821 in Thionville, Ermengarde married the Carolingian Emperor Lothair I of the Franks (795–855).

Ermengarde used her bridal gift to found the abbey Erstein in the Elsass, in which she is buried. Ermengarde died in 851.

Lothair and Ermengarde had:
Louis II of Italy
 Helletrud (Hiltrud) (c. 826–after 865/866) m. Count Berengar (d. before 865/866)
 Bertha (c. 830–after 7 May 852, probably 877), became before 847 Abbess of Avenay, perhaps Äbtissin of Faremoutiers
 A daughter of unknown name (b. probably 826/830), called Ermengarde in later sources, kidnapped 846 by Gilbert, Count of the Maasgau, who then married her
 Gisla (c. 830–860) 851–860 Abbess of San Salvatore in Brescia
Lothair II
 Rotrud (baptized 835/840 in Pavia) m. around 850/851 Lambert, Margrave of Brittany, Count of Nantes (Widonen), who died 1 May 852
 Charles of Provence

Appearance
"Her voice is as pure as gold and clear as the note of zither. Her skin is as roses mixed in snow. Her blonde hair circles her head like a chrysolith. Her eyes are lively, her white neck like milk, lillies, ivory. Her graceful hands are like the snow."

References

Sources
102

|-

851 deaths
Frankish queens consort
Holy Roman Empresses
German queens consort
Italian queens consort
Lombardic queens consort
Lotharingian queens consort
Carolingian dynasty
9th-century Italian women
Etichonid dynasty
Year of birth unknown
Women from the Carolingian Empire
9th-century Lombard people
9th-century Lotharingian people